The Saint Lawrence River Divide is a continental divide in central and eastern North America that separates the Great Lakes-St. Lawrence River Basin from the southerly Atlantic Ocean watersheds. Water, including rainfall and snowfall, lakes, rivers and streams, north and west of the divide, drains into the Gulf of St. Lawrence or the Labrador Sea; water south and east of the divide drains into the Atlantic Ocean (east of the Eastern Continental Divide, ECD) or Gulf of Mexico (west of the ECD).  The divide is one of six continental divides in North America that demarcate several watersheds that flow to different gulfs, seas or oceans.

Course

The divide has its origin at ‘Hill of Three Waters’ triple divide on the Laurentian Divide approx. 2 miles north of Hibbing, Minnesota.  It follows a ridge south of the shore of Lake Superior, and then follows the ridge between the Wisconsin River and Fox River watersheds.  From there it swoops south of Lake Michigan and Lake Erie along several recessional moraines such as the Valparaiso Moraine and Wabash Moraine.

It then crosses into the Allegheny Plateau and into upper New York, where it runs southeast of the St. Lawrence River, dipping briefly below Lake Champlain before running northeasterly following the western border of Maine and Quebec. It continues into the Notre-Dame Mountains in Quebec, then turns southeasterly through central New Brunswick. From there, the divide runs easterly along the northern coast of Nova Scotia to Cape Canso.

Hydrology

The hydrology of the Great Lakes-St. Lawrence basin is elaborate: Lake Nipigon drains via the Nipigon River, the primary tributary of Lake Superior, into Nipigon Bay in central northern Lake Superior. Lake Superior drains from its eastern end southeast via the St. Mary's River into Lake Huron; hydrologically, Lake Michigan is one with Lake Huron through the wide Straits of Mackinac at the northern end; the southwestern portion of Lake Michigan drains via the Chicago Drainage Canal into the Illinois River thence to the Gulf of Mexico. Lake Huron drains through its southern tip southerly via the St. Clair River into Lake St. Clair then southerly via the Detroit River into western Lake Erie. Lake Erie drains northerly from its northeastern end via the Niagara River into the southwestern end of Lake Ontario. Lake Ontario drains northeasterly from its northeastern end into the St. Lawrence River, and thence into the Gulf of St. Lawrence. Finally, much of the coastal and central Labrador region, especially via Lake Melville, drains to the Labrador Sea.

Canals

Four canals cross the divide: The Champlain Canal connects Lake Champlain to the Hudson River watershed. The Erie Canal connects Lake Erie to the Hudson River watershed.  The Chicago Sanitary and Ship Canal crosses the Chicago Portage and connects Lake Michigan to the Mississippi River watershed. The Portage Canal connects the Fox River to the Wisconsin River at Portage, Wisconsin.  Historically there were additional canals, e.g., the Ohio and Erie Canal, but most of these are no longer in operation.

Locations

References

Geographic coordinate lists
Geography of the United States
Drainage divides
Drainage basins of North America
Saint Lawrence River